Ania is a Polish diminutive of Anna. For a list of people with the name, see Anya.

Ania may also refer to:

Ania (plant), genus of terrestrial orchids
Ania (moth), genus of geometer moths
Kuşadası, district of Aydın Province, Turkey, formerly known as Ania
Ania (singer) (born 1981), Polish singer and composer
Ania Freer, Australian-Jamaican documentary filmmaker

Polish feminine given names